Paul Alverdes (6 May 1897, Strasbourg - 28 February 1979, Munich) was a German novelist and poet.

The son of an officer and member of the German Youth Movement, he volunteered for duty in World War I and received a severe injury to the throat.  After 1922 he was a freelance author in Munich, and from 1934 to 1944, along with Karl Benno von Mechow, he edited and published the journal Das innere Reich.  Alverdes's work was influenced by the youth movement and by the World War I front experience, whose purifying and "transforming" power he praised.  Nonetheless, he was only moderately popular with National Socialists because he lacked an "activist-dynamic attitude".  After 1945 he mainly wrote stories for children.

Works
 Die Nördlichen (The Northerners; 1922)
 Die Pfeiferstube (The Whistler's Room; 1929)
 Reinhold oder die Verwandelten
 Die Freiwilligen (The Volunteers; 1934)
 Das Winterlager
 Eine Infanterie – Division bricht durch
 Deutsches Andenkenbuch
 Das Zwiegesicht
 Dank und Dienst. Reden und Aufsätze
 Märchen (Das Männlein Mittenzwei) (The Little In-Between Man; 1937)
 Grimmbarts Haus (Grimbart's House; 1949)
 Legende vom Christ-Esel (1953)
 Wenig Träum Pferde (1958) (Little Dream Horses)

References
 Furness, Raymond and Malcolm Humble (1991). "A Companion to Twentieth Century German Literature." London and New York: Routledge. .
 Christian Zentner, Friedemann Bedürftig (1991). The Encyclopedia of the Third Reich.  Macmillan, New York. 

1897 births
1979 deaths
Writers from Strasbourg
People from Alsace-Lorraine
German Army personnel of World War I
German male writers